Dendrotriton xolocalcae, commonly known as the Xolocalca bromeliad salamander or Xolocalco bromeliad salamander, is a species of salamander in the family Plethodontidae. It is endemic to Chiapas, Mexico, and only known from its type locality, Cerro Ovando, at an elevation of about  asl. The specific name xolocalcae is derived from the Indian name of Cerro Ovando, Xolocalco.

Description
The body and head are flattened, and the head is much broader than the body. The hands and feet are large. Only the first finger and toe are webbed; the digits are broad and truncate. The tail is slender and attenuated. There are three distinct color patters: most specimens are mottled brownish-lavender above, with a black, triangular head marking. Some specimens have a pair of cream dorsolateral lines that start from the eyelid and continue back. The third variety has pinkish cream back and tail, with a pair of black dots on neck and a blackish triangle behind it. The underside is dirty cream.

Habitat and conservation
It appears to be abundant within its small range, given that as many as 34 individuals have been spotted in a single bromeliad. The locality is potentially threatened by expanding agriculture and wood extraction, although so far the area has seen minimal anthropogenic impacts. It might occur in the nearby El Triunfo Biosphere Reserve, although it has not been encountered there.

References

xolocalcae
Endemic amphibians of Mexico
Sierra Madre de Chiapas
Amphibians described in 1941
Taxa named by Edward Harrison Taylor
Taxonomy articles created by Polbot